Christopher Paul Kelly (born 24 April 1940) is an English TV presenter, producer and writer.

Education
Kelly was born in 1940 at Cuddington in Cheshire. He was educated at Downside School, a Catholic independent school in Stratton-on-the-Fosse in Somerset, followed by Clare College, Cambridge.

Career

Kelly worked as a continuity announcer for Anglia Television in 1963 before embarking on a long career as a presenter.

Kelly is probably best known as the presenter of Wish You Were Here...?, Food and Drink and Clapperboard. His network television credits include Zoo Time, in succession to Desmond Morris, Sixth Form Challenge, The Royal Film Performance, The Royal Academy Summer Exhibition, I've Got a Secret, Kellyvision, Anything You Can Do, Vintage Quiz,  Cinema and Quisine. As well as co-presenting World in Action for a season he was the programme's principal off-screen narrator for many years. He also worked extensively for regionally based TV companies including Anglia, where he wrote and presented an arts programme Folio, and Tyne Tees where he co-presented the first regular ninety-minute live programme on British television, Friday Live.

Following the success of "The Zero Option", a two-hour screenplay he originated and co-wrote for Central, a thirteen-part series Saracen, was transmitted.  Kelly wrote two episodes.  He produced series one and two of Soldier Soldier for Central, the first of which won the Gold Award for Best Drama Series at the 1992 Houston International Film Festival. His career as a TV producer has also included A Line in the Sand, Monsignor Renard, Without Motive, and Kavanagh QC.

He is the former owner of the Midsummer House restaurant in Cambridge. Kelly has also written several books.  "The Telebook", "Kellyvision" (winner Silver Medal, New York Festival of Film and Television), and four novels: "The War of Covent Garden", "Forest of the Night", "Taking Leave" and "A Suit of Lights".

Publications

 1986 – The Telebook (Oxford University Press. )
 1990 - "The War of Covent Garden" (Oxford University Press. )
 1991 - "The Forest of the Night" (Oxford University Press. )
 1995 - "Taking Leave" (Hodder & Stoughton. )
 2000 - "A Suit of LIghts (Hodder & Stoughton. )

References

External links

1940 births
English television producers
English screenwriters
English male screenwriters
English television presenters
Living people
People from Cuddington, Eddisbury
English television writers
People educated at Downside School
Alumni of Clare College, Cambridge
British male television writers